This article is a list of seasons completed by the Washington Commanders of the National Football League (NFL). The team was founded as the Boston Braves, being named after the local baseball franchise.

Washington has played over 1,000 games. In those games, the club won five professional American football championships including two NFL Championships and three Super Bowls.  The franchise captured ten NFL divisional titles and six NFL conference championships. Washington won the 1937 and 1942 Championship games, as well as Super Bowl XVII, XXII, and XXVI.  They also played in and lost the 1936, 1940, 1943, and 1945 Championship games, as well as Super Bowl VII and XVIII.  They have made 24 postseason appearances, and have an overall postseason record of 23 wins and 19 losses.  Only five teams have appeared in more Super Bowls than Washington: the New England Patriots (eleven), the Dallas Cowboys, Pittsburgh Steelers, Denver Broncos (eight), and San Francisco 49ers (six); Washington's five appearances are tied with the Oakland Raiders, Miami Dolphins, New York Giants and Green Bay Packers.

All of Washington's league titles were attained during two ten-year spans. Washington has also experienced failure in its history.

Seasons

Footnotes

References

 
 
 
 
 
 
 

Seasons
Washington Commanders
Washington Commanders seasons